Silvanas, alternatively spelled as sylvanas or sylvannas, is a Filipino frozen cookie consisting of a layer of buttercream sandwiched between two cashew-meringue wafers coated with cookie crumbs. Silvanas are the cookie versions of the Sans rival, a Filipino cake made from similar ingredients.

A restaurant in Dumaguete called Sans Rival Cakes and Pastries is popularly known for their silvanas.

See also

 Caycay
 Mango float
 Inipit
 Ube cheesecake
 List of cookies

References

Cookies
Philippine cuisine
Cashew dishes